Schoharie Bridge, also known as Fox Creek Bridge, is a wooden covered bridge over Fox Creek down the road from the Old Stone Fort in Schoharie County, New York.

References

External links
 Schoharie Bridge, at Covered Bridges of the Northeast USA

Covered bridges in New York (state)
Bridges completed in 1980
Wooden bridges in New York (state)
Buildings and structures in Schoharie County, New York
Transportation in Schoharie County, New York
Tourist attractions in Schoharie County, New York
Road bridges in New York (state)